Elections to South Lanarkshire Council took place on 4 May 2017 on the same day as the 31 other Scottish local government elections.

For the first time in a South Lanarkshire election, the Scottish National Party (SNP) were returned with the most seats at 27 despite losing one seat from the previous election. Labour lost significant ground as they one third of their seats and fell from the largest party – one seat away from an overall majority – to second with 22 councillors. The Conservatives recorded their best ever result in a South Lanarkshire election as they won 14 seats – up from just three in 2017. The remaining seat was won by the Liberal Democrats.

Following the election, the SNP attempted to form a coalition with Labour and the Liberal Democrats but were unsuccessful. The SNP then formed a minority administration.

Election result

Source: 

Notes:
"Votes" are the first preference votes. The net gain/loss and percentage changes relate to the result of the previous Scottish local elections on 3 May 2012. This may differ from other published sources showing gain/loss relative to seats held at dissolution of Scotland's councils.
Due to boundary changes, the total number of seats was reduced from 67 to 64.

Ward results

Clydesdale West
Labour held both the seats they had won at the previous election while the SNP held one of their two seats and the Conservatives gained one seat

Clydesdale North
Labour and the SNP held the seats they had won at the previous election while the Conservatives gained a seat from independent Ed Archer.

Clydesdale East
The SNP held the seat they had won at the previous election while the Conservatives held one seat and gained one seat from Labour.

Clydesdale South
The SNP held the seat they had won at the previous election while Labour held one of their two seats and lost one to the Conservatives.

Avondale and Stonehouse
Following the Fifth Statutory Reviews of Electoral Arrangements, Avondale and Stonehouse was reduced in size from a four-member ward to a three-member ward. The SNP retained one of the two seats they had won at the previous election while Labour retained their only seat. Incumbent and former independent councillor Graeme Campbell held his seat but was elected as a Conservative councillor.

East Kilbride South
The SNP (2) and Labour (1) retained the seats they had won at the previous election.

East Kilbride Central South
The SNP held the seat they had won at the previous election and gained one from Labour while Labour held one of their two seats.

East Kilbride Central North
Following the Fifth Statutory Reviews of Electoral Arrangements, East Kilbride Central North was reduced in size from a four-member ward to a three-member ward. The SNP retained both of the seats they had won at the previous election while Labour retained one of their two seats.

East Kilbride West
The Conservatives, Labour and the SNP held the seats they had won at the previous election.

East Kilbride East
The SNP (2) and Labour (1) retained the seats they had won at the previous election.

Rutherglen South
The SNP, the Liberal Democrats and Labour retained the seats they had won at the previous election.

Rutherglen Central and North
The SNP held the seat they had won at the previous election while Labour held one of their two seats and the Conservatives gained one seat from Labour.

Cambuslang West
The SNP held the seat they had won at the previous election while Labour held one of their two seats and the Conservatives gained one seat from Labour.

Cambuslang East
The SNP held the seat they had won at the previous election and gained a second seat from Labour while Labour held one of their two seats.

Blantyre
Following the Fifth Statutory Reviews of Electoral Arrangements, Blantyre was reduced in size from a four-member ward to a three-member ward. Labour retained two of the three seats they had won at the previous election while the SNP retained their only seat.

Bothwell and Uddingston
The SNP, Labour and the Conservatives held the seats they won at the previous election.

Hamilton North and East
The SNP retained the seat they had won at the previous election while Labour held one of their two seats and the Conservatives gained one seat from Labour.

Hamilton West and Earnock
The SNP held both of their seats while Labour held one of their two seats and the Conservatives gained one seat from Labour.

Hamilton South
The SNP held both of their seats while Labour held one of their two seats and the Conservatives gained one seat from Labour.

Larkhall
Labour held both of their seats while the SNP held one of their two seats and the Conservatives gained one seat from the SNP.

By-elections

Rutherglen Central and North
On 23 June 2017, Labour councillor Gerard Killen resigned his seat having been elected as an MP for Rutherglen and Hamilton West. A by-election was held on 23 November 2017 and was won by Labour's Martin Lennon.

East Kilbride Central North
On 2 June 2019 East Kilbride Central North Independent and former SNP councillor Sheena Wardhaugh died. A by-election was held on 29 August 2019, won by the SNP's Grant Ferguson.

Notes

References

2017
2017 Scottish local elections
21st century in South Lanarkshire